Dharavi is a slum in Mumbai, India.

Dharavi may also refer to:

Dharavi (film), a 1991 Hindi film
Dharavi (Vidhan Sabha constituency), a constituency located in Mumbai City district
Dharavi Bhet, a peninsula near Mumbai, India